

Events
 May 1 – In Florence, nine-year-old Dante Alighieri first sees eight-year-old Beatrice, his lifelong muse.

Works
 Bonvesin da la Riva, Liber di Tre Scricciur

Births
 Nasiruddin Chiragh Dehlavi (died 1356), mystic-poet and a Sufi saint of Chishti Order
 Ibn al-Yayyab (died 1349), statesman and poet from the Nasrid kingdom of Granada

Deaths
 Lal Shahbaz Qalander (born 1177), sufi saint, philosopher, poet and qalandar

References

13th-century poetry
Poetry